Eva Syková (born 1944) is a Czech neuroscientist whose research focused on the origins, mechanisms and maintenance of ionic and volume homeostasis in the CNS and the role of extrasynaptic transmission, spinal cord injury. She is currently leading several clinical studies, including a Phase I/II study in patients with spinal cord injury as well as ongoing clinical studies of patients with ALS and ischemic leg injury. She was director of Institute of Experimental Medicine and the head of the Center for Cell Therapy and Tissue Repair at Charles University in Prague. Eva Syková is author of 421 publications and co-holder of 7 patents with an H-index of 50.

Publications
 Ion-selective microelectrodes and their use in excitable tissues, 1980
 Ionic and volume in the microenvironment of nerve and receptor cells, 1992

References

Charles University alumni
Scientists from Prague
1944 births
People from Rožmitál pod Třemšínem
Recipients of Medal of Merit (Czech Republic)
Czech neuroscientists
Czech women neuroscientists
Living people
Czech women scientists
21st-century women scientists
Czech Social Democratic Party Senators
ANO 2011 politicians